Evo Nine (Thai:อีโว ไนน์), is a Thai pop band debuted with the single, "Make You Dance" in March 2013

History 

Members

Discography

Singles

 2013: Make You Dance
 2013: Superman
 2013: The Other feat. Candy Mafia
 2014: BATMAN (มนุษย์ค้างคาว)

Awards
 2013: Kazz Awards 2013
 2013: Playpark Music Awards 2013

Image Member

External links

 Twitter:Evo Nine
 Instagram:Evo Nine
 Facebook:Evo Nine
 Evo Nine

Thai pop music groups
Thai boy bands
Vocal quintets
Musical groups from Bangkok